Wavertree Lock-up is an 18th-century grade II listed village lock-up located in Wavertree, Liverpool, England.

History
Funded by local residents, the lock-up was constructed in 1796 as a drunk tank to hold intoxicated persons overnight. Prior to its construction a local unpaid constable was charged with looking after drunks in their own home all the while claiming an expense of 2 shillings. Eventually, it became cheaper for a lock-up to be built rather than house drunks with a constable and therefore the building was constructed. Made from yellow sandstone, the building is octagonal in shape, two storeys high and made of local sandstone. 

During the 1840s the lock-up served as an isolation room for cholera victims and later during the Irish famine accommodation for families. In 1869, James Picton replaced the building's original flat roof with a pointed one to prevent prisoners from escaping through the building's roof.

See also
Grade II listed buildings in Liverpool-L15

References

External links
 

Grade II listed buildings in Liverpool
Buildings and structures completed in 1796
Unused buildings in Liverpool
1796 establishments in England